D'Wayne Taylor (born November 6, 1979) is a former Canadian football linebacker. He was signed by the Saskatchewan Roughriders as an undrafted free agent in 2003. He played college football at New Mexico State.

Taylor also played for the Ottawa Renegades and Montreal Alouettes.

External links
Montreal Alouettes bio

1979 births
Living people
Players of Canadian football from Oakland, California
American players of Canadian football
Canadian football linebackers
New Mexico State Aggies football players
Saskatchewan Roughriders players
Ottawa Renegades players
Montreal Alouettes players